Nuri Iskandar (born 1938 in Deir al-Zur, Syria), is an Assyrian Syrian musicologist and composer, he is known for his work in Syriac sacral and folk music.

Biography 
Nuri Iskandar was born in Deir al-Zur to an Assyrian family originally from Urfa in modern-day Turkey. His family moved to Aleppo in 1941, he joined the local Syriac Orthodox scout band where he took his first music lessons. He studied at the higher institute of music at the University of Cairo Between 1959 and 1964 and graduated with B.A degree in music.

He started composing Syriac folk music in the early 1970s popular songs like  O habibo,  Zliqe frisi,  Lo tehfukh and others. Upon returning to Syria he established a number of Choirs, and in 1973, he participated in the first modern festival of Assyrian music in Beirut. Presenting a number of Assyrian/Syriac folk songs with the Lebanese musician Wadi al-Safi.

He presented a number of Operettas in Syriac and Arabic the most notable of them were  Furqono.
Nouri is currently the director of the Music Conservatory of Aleppo.

References

External links
 
 

1938 births
Living people
Syrian composers
Syrian people of Assyrian descent
Assyrian/Syriac Syrians
Syriac Orthodox Christians
Syrian Oriental Orthodox Christians
Assyrian musicians